Max Bruns (born 6 November 2002) is a Dutch professional footballer who plays as a midfielder for Eredivisie club Twente.

Career
Bruns originally played for MVV '29 from Harbrinkhoek, before joining the Twente youth academy in 2016.

Bruns made his professional debut with Twente in a 3–0 Eredivisie loss to PSV on 6 February 2021. On 17 February 2021, he signed his first professional contract with Twente for 2+1 years.

References

External links
 

2002 births
Living people
Sportspeople from Almelo
Dutch footballers
Association football midfielders
FC Twente players
Eredivisie players
Footballers from Overijssel